Hartford Public Schools is the school district of Hartford, Michigan. The current superintendent is Andrew Hubbard. Hartford Public Schools offers school choice, allowing families to request the school setting they like best. Hartford Public Schools also offers the Open Choice program which allows students to attend schools in nearby districts.

Schools
 Redwood Elementary, grades pre-K–5
 Hartford Middle School, grades 6–8
 Hartford High School, grades 9–12

References

External links

 

School districts in Michigan
Public Schools